Agonocheila is a genus of beetles in the family Carabidae, containing the following species:

 Agonocheila anomala Chaudoir, 1869
 Agonocheila antipodum (Bates, 1867)
 Agonocheila biguttata Chaudoir, 1869
 Agonocheila bimaculata Sloane, 1920
 Agonocheila chaudoiri Sloane, 1898
 Agonocheila cribripennis Chaudoir, 1869
 Agonocheila curtula (Erichson, 1842)
 Agonocheila fasciata Sloane, 1898
 Agonocheila fenestrata Blackburn, 1892
 Agonocheila flindersi Sloane, 1920
 Agonocheila guttata Chaudoir, 1848
 Agonocheila irrita (Newman, 1842)
 Agonocheila koebelei Blackburn, 1895
 Agonocheila lutosa (Newman, 1840)
 Agonocheila macleayi Sloane, 1911
 Agonocheila mollis (Newman, 1842)
 Agonocheila ovalis Sloane, 1923
 Agonocheila perplexa Blackburn, 1894
 Agonocheila plagiata Sloane, 1916
 Agonocheila punctulata Sloane, 1911
 Agonocheila quadricollis Sloane, 1911
 Agonocheila ruficollis Sloane, 1898
 Agonocheila signata Moore, 1963
 Agonocheila sinuosa Chaudoir, 1869
 Agonocheila stictica Blackburn, 1895
 Agonocheila subfasciata Chaudoir, 1869
 Agonocheila sublaevis Chaudoir, 1869
 Agonocheila suturalis Macleay, 1871
 Agonocheila vittula Chaudoir, 1869

References

Lebiinae